Scythris helskloofensis is a moth of the family Scythrididae. It was described by Bengt Å. Bengtsson in 2014. It is found in Northern Cape, South Africa.

References

Endemic moths of South Africa
helskloofensis
Moths described in 2014